Allama Khalid Masud (16 December 1935 – 1 October 2003), was a Muslim scholar of Pakistan. He spent the major part of his life with Moulana Amin Ahsan Islahi. He conveyed ideas and thoughts of his teacher and Imam Farhi to general public. He wrote a number of books and articles and delivered lectures on Islam, science and other subjects.

By profession he was a chemical engineer but he spent his life in serving Farahi's school of thought. He worked as in charge of Idara Taddabur e Qur'an o Hadith.

Early life
Allama Khalid Masud was born in Lilla Town, Jhelum District, Pakistan. He belonged to a religious family having association with sufi school of thought, Naqshbandi Mujaddadi. But he and his father Saif U Rehman both were not under influence of sufism and they concentrated mainly towards Qur'an and Sharia. His father Saif U Rehman completed his education in 1926 from Oriental College Lahore where he learnt Arabic as major subject. He was a scholarly person. He kept his eldest son with him during his teaching services in schools of different cities. He played a major role in upbringing of his beloved child. Khalid Masud learnt basics of Arabic and Persian from his father Saif U Rehman who was an Arabic teacher at his time.

Education and career
He did his Master's degree in Chemistry from Punjab University, Lahore in 1958. In 1964 he went to London for higher studies. He obtained Chemical Engineering Diploma from King's College in 1965. He remained President of UK Islamic Mission there. He also got his Master's degree in Islamic studies from Punjab University in 1975.

He joined Industries Department, Govt of Punjab in 1958. He worked there for 27 years. In 1985 he was offered position of Research Scholar in Quaid e Azam Library, Bagh e Jinnah Lahore. He worked there till his retirement in 1996. There he found every opportunity to do his research work.

During his student life (from 1956 to 1958), he remained in charge / Nazam of Islami Jamiat-e-Talaba Lahore. But after completion of his studies he did not join Jamiat's parent party Jamat-e-Islami and preferred to learn Qur'an and Hadith from Maulana Amin Ahsan Islahi.

Association with Maulana Islahi

In 1958 Maulana Amin Ahsan Islahi separated from politics and Jamat-e-Islami and created a Halqa Taddabur Qur'an O Hadith. Khalid Masud was one of his early pupils who joined his Halqa. He was his only pupil who spent so much time with from 1958 till his death. He associated himself with Maulana Amin Ahsan Islahi and remained with him till his death. Khalid Masud did a major role in converting knowledge of his teacher from his lectures into text for the benefits of the public. He also helped him in writing his famous tafseer Taddabur e Qur'an. Maulana Islahi had admired a number of times his efforts in spreading Farahi's & Islahi's schools of thought.
Maulana Islahi appointed him Nazam of his Idara Taddabur Qur'an o Hadith and chief editor of his quarterly journal Taddabur in 1981. He served his teacher and Idara for twenty two years till his death in 2003.

After death of Maulana Islahi, management of Madras Ul Islah, Siray Mir Azam Garh UP India arranged Imam Farahi Seminar in January 1999 and especially invited Allama Khalid Masud in place of Maulana Islahi. He presented two papers there. They offered him chair of Imam Farahi for presiding the seminar.

Books and magazines

He wrote a number of books on Qur'an, Hadith, Grammar, Islam and Science for all ages.

Qur'an

 Qur'an e Hakim
Abridged version of Maulana Islahi's Tadabbur-i-Qur'an in one volume.
 Hikmat e Qur'an
Based on Allama Hamiduddin Farahi's Arabic books. He converted it into Urdu Language for the benefit of the general public.

Hadith

 Taddabur e Hadith – Sahih Bukhari by Maulana Amin Ahsan Islahi {Two Volumes}
 Taddabur e Hadith – Mowta Imam Malik]] by Maulana [[Amin Ahsan Islahi {Two Volumes}

He converted audio lectures of his teacher Maulana Islahi into books by editing and adding and deleting necessary / unnecessary portions.

Sirah

 Hayat e Rasul e Ummi.

In this book he tried to discuss and to clear some issues related to life of Muhammad in the light of Qur'an with a different and non-traditional approach.

In this book he adopted a different non-traditional approach. He put Quran as first source of history. Then he accepted those narrations which match the Quran's statement. He did not accept any narration which was in contradiction Quran.

Moreover, he sorted out different narration on a very logical manner.

Imam Farahi's Work 

"Most of Farahi's work was in Arabic. Farahi’s chief scholarly interest was the Quran, the focal point of all his writings. Most of his published works are in the form of notes that were later compiled by his followers such Maulana Amin Ahsan Islahi and Allama Khalid Masud.

Below is some of the books which were compiled by both the personalities:

 Mufradat al Quran (”Vocabulary of the Quran")
 Asalib al Quran (”Style of the Quran")
 Jamhara-tul-Balaghah (”Manual of Quranic Rhetoric")
 Im’an Fi Aqsam al-Qur’an (A Study of the Qur’anic Oaths)
 'في من هو الذبيح' (Fi man huwa al-Dhabih: Which of Abraham's son was Sacrificed?)
 Nizam al-Qur’an (Coherence in the Qur’an, a commentary on the Qur’an"

Grammar 

 Asbaq Al Nahw

This book is reproduction of original work of Maulana Hamiduddin Farahi.  He added more exercises and extended its chapters to customise it for students in a simple language.  His effort made it easier for student to learn Arabic grammar

For children 

He wrote a number of books for children on the topics of science. These include

  Ibtedai Falkiyat      in Urdu (Basic Astronomy)
  Kurrah Zamin          in Urdu (Earth)
  Podun ki Zindagi      in Urdu (Life of Plants)
  Alam e Haywanat       in Urdu (Zoology)
  Musalman aur Science  in Urdu (Muslims and Science)
  Ibtedai Bahr Pamai    in Urdu (Basic Navigation)

Above books were published by Quaid e Azam Library Lahore for children on science.

Translations into Urdu

He translated following great books into Urdu language to make it easier for students of science and philosophy.

 Francis Bacon's Novum Organum with Neoatlantas.
It describes Bacon's belief that new system of logic is superior to the old ways of syllogism.

 Bertrand Russell's Our Knowledge of the External World. This book expresses much of Russell's thinking about science.
 Isaac Newton's Philosophiæ Naturalis Principia Mathematica (Latin: "The Mathematical Principles of Natural Philosophy").It contains the statement of Newton's laws of motion forming the foundation of classical mechanics, as well as his law of universal gravitation and a derivation of Kepler's laws for the motion of the planets.
 Isaac Newton's Opticks. This book is about Optics and refraction of light.

Above all great books which were translated by Khalid Masud in a very good Urdu language are published by National Language Authority Pakistan.

Magazines

He performed editorial job of a few magazines in following capacities
 Chief Editor of Taddabur
Taddabur is a quarterly journal of Idara Taddabur i Qur'an o Hadith. It publishes articles on Farahi's Islahi's School of thoughts. He was its first editor and worked for it till his death.
 Editor of Quarterly Journal of Quaid e Azam Library.
On joining Quaid e Azam Library in 1985, editorial responsibility of its quarterly journal was handed over to him. He worked for it till his retirement in 1995.

In addition to above he wrote for different other magazines such as Meesaq & Shams ul Islam.

Professional workHe wrote a number of article during his service in Punjab Industries Department Lahore. These include''

 Chemical Investigations on the seeds of Ficus Bangalensis.
 Synthetic tanning material from black liquor.
 Mechanism of heat transfer in the boiling regime.
 Sulphur dyes from black liquor.
 Survey report on paint & varnish industry in Punjab.

Death

He had been suffering from hepatitis C for a number of years. He died on 1 October 2003 at 2:20 pm in Jinnah Hospital Lahore. Famous scholar and companion of Islahi School of thought Allama Javed Ahmed Ghamidi offered his funeral prayer at Dongi Ground Samanabad Lahore. He was buried in his native village Lilla District Jehlum with his ancestors.

See also 
 Islamic scholars
 List of Pakistanis

References

External links 
 Pupil of Maulana Amin Ahsan Islahi
 List of books published by National Language Authority Pakistan
 Islahi's intellectual heir
 Quaid e Azam Library Lahore
 Founders of Madras ul Islah

1935 births
2003 deaths
20th-century Muslim scholars of Islam
Pakistani chemical engineers
Pakistani scholars
People from Jhelum District
People from Lahore
Pakistani non-fiction writers
University of the Punjab alumni
20th-century non-fiction writers